James Alexander Burns (5 November 1907 – 22 May 2003) was an English track and field athlete who competed for Great Britain in the 1932 Summer Olympics and in the 1936 Summer Olympics. He was born in Newcastle upon Tyne. His grandson was Richard Burns, the 2001 World Rally Champion.

In 1932 he finished seventh in the Olympic 5000 metres event. Four years later he finished fifth in the 10,000 metres competition at the 1936 Games. At the 1934 Empire Games he won the bronze medal in the 3 miles contest.

References

sports-reference.com

1907 births
2003 deaths
Sportspeople from Newcastle upon Tyne
English male long-distance runners
Olympic athletes of Great Britain
Athletes (track and field) at the 1932 Summer Olympics
Athletes (track and field) at the 1936 Summer Olympics
Commonwealth Games bronze medallists for England
Commonwealth Games medallists in athletics
Athletes (track and field) at the 1934 British Empire Games
Medallists at the 1934 British Empire Games